The Mountains of the Central Dingle Peninsula are the generic name given to the mountains that lie on the Dingle Peninsula between the Brandon Group of mountains in the west, and the Slieve Mish Mountains at the eastern end of the peninsula.

Geology
Like many of the mountain ranges in Kerry, such as the MacGillycuddy Reeks, the mountains of the Central Dingle peninsula are composed predominantly of Devonian period Old Red Sandstone, with a band of Ordovician period metasediments.

The rocks date from the Upper Devonian period (310–450 million years ago) when Ireland was in a hot equatorial setting.  During this 60 million year period, Ireland was the site of a major basin, known as the Munster basin, and Cork and Kerry were effectively a large alluvial floodplain.  Chemical oxidation stained the material with a purple–reddish colour (and green in places from chlorination), still visible today.  There are virtually no fossils in Old Red Sandstone.

The composition of Old Red Sandstone is variable and includes sandstones, mudstones, siltstones, and conglomerates (boulders containing quartz pebbles are visible throughout the range).  The mountains were subject to significant glaciation with corries and U-shaped valleys, however the range does not have the sharp rocky arêtes and ridges of the MacGillycuddy Reeks range.

List of peaks

The following is a download from the MountainViews Online Database, who list 23 identifiable Central Dingle peaks with an elevation, or height, above 100 metres

See also
Brandon Group, a mountain range in Dingle Peninsula
Slieve Mish Mountains, a mountain range in Dingle Peninsula
Lists of mountains in Ireland
List of mountains of the British Isles by height
List of P600 mountains in the British Isles
List of Marilyns in the British Isles
List of Hewitt mountains in England, Wales and Ireland

Notes

References

Mountains and hills of County Kerry